Tungsten(III) oxide (W2O3) is a compound of tungsten and oxygen. It has  been reported (2006) as being  grown as a thin film by atomic layer deposition  at temperatures between 140 and 240 °C using W2(N(CH3)2)6 as a precursor. It is not referred to in major textbooks. Some older literature refers to  the compound W2O3 but as the atomic weight of tungsten was believed at the time to be 92, i.e., approximately half the modern accepted value of 183.84, the compound actually being referred to was WO3.

Reports about the compound date back to at least the 1970s, but only in as thin films or surfaces – no bulk synthesis of the material is known.

Usage
Tungsten(III) oxide is used in various types of infrared absorbing coatings and foils.

References

Tungsten compounds
Sesquioxides
Transition metal oxides